Navnindra Behl is an Indian theatre and television director, writer and actor.

Early life 
Behl was born in a Jatt Sikh family. She started stage acting when she was just three years old. Besides participation in plays at school and college, she got involved in amateur theatre at Patiala a former princely state in India, and did her post graduation in Punjabi literature.

Career
Shortly after her graduation, Navnindra Behl joined Drama Department of Punjabi University, Patiala as a lecturer. Besides writing and directing a number of stage plays, Navnindra owns the credit for training and grooming many stage, television and film artists during her career of 37 years as lecturer, reader, professor and head of department. She was Director, Audio Visual Research Centre funded by CEC (University Grants Commission, Delhi) for 3 years and has 25 years' experience of teaching production, direction and acting for television at Patiala University and as visiting faculty in various institutes. She has acted in numerous stage plays.

She has an experience of 30 years as writer, actress and director in television industry. She has directed films and serials for television, written scripts for television programmes for Doordarshan, documentaries for Central and Punjab Government Departments, documentaries and educational programmes for Audio Visual Research Centre, CEC, Delhi and Films Division.

She has 15 years' experience as writer and actress in film industry and has acted with film makers of high repute such as Gulzar (Maachis, 1996), Dibakar Banerjee (Oye Lucky! Lucky Oye!), Vishal Bhardwaj (Gubaare) and Hollywood projects like The Pride and The Guru.

She has been member on the selection panels of UPSC (for theatre & media), Rabindra Bharti University & has been on the list of board of experts and advisors of Indian Theatre Deptt., Punjab University, Chandigarh, Doordarshan Kendra, Jullundur & Deptt. of Cultural Affairs Ministry, Delhi Govt.
In addition to being Member Syndicate and Member Academic Council, Punjabi University, Patiala, she has been on the panel as eminent visiting faculty of Punjab University, Jaipur University, Garhwal University, GNDU University, Amritsar, Film & Television Institute Kolkata, Mumbai University, etc.
Author of ten books, as creative writer, research related subjects on theatre and media studies, she has made significant contribution as resource person and keynote speaker at many conferences, seminars and workshops on cinema, television and theatre.

Filmography

As producer 

 Vijji Amma, a documentary of the life of social activist Vijji Srinivasan for Films Division, Mumbai.
 Rangmanch Ke Teen Rang, a documentary on Folk Theatre Forms of North India produced by North Zone Cultural Centre, Patiala.
 Dhund, Hanera te Jugnu, a documentary on elections in Punjab for Punjab Govt.
 Many documentaries and lecture series for Educational Multi Media Research Centre, Govt. of India.
 Khanabadosh, a 13-part serial for Department of Adul Education, Govt. of India, New Delhi.
 Woh Ladki Serial for Doordarshan
 Roop Basant Serial for Doordarshan
 Peele Patton Ki Dastan tele serial for Doordarshan
 Rani Kokilan tele film for Doordarshan
 Chirion Ka Chamba tele film for Doordarshan

As director 

 Vijji Amma, documentary
 Rangmanch Ke Teen Rang, documentary on Folk Theatre Forms of North India produced by North Zone Cultural Centre, Patiala.
 Dhund, Hanera te Jugnu, documentary
 Many documentaries and lecture series for Educational Multi Media Research Centre, Govt. of India.
 Khanabadosh, a 13-part serial
 Bruhon Paar Na Jayin, Stage Play
 Sadda Jaggon Seer Mukkeya, Stage Play
 Naun Baran Dus, Stage Play
 Kashmir Diary, Stage Play
 Razayi, Stage Play
 Bandmaster, Stage Play
 Bhabi Maina, Stage Play
 Kumaraswami, Stage Play
 Peele Pattean Di Dastan, TV Serial
 Wo Ladki, Telefilm
 Roop Basant' Serial for Doordarshan
 Rani Kokilan, Telefilm
 Chirion Ka Chamba, Telefilm
 Saanp, Stage Play
 Bagula Bhagat, Stage Play
 Daldal, Stage Play
 Baaki Itihas, Stage Play

As a writer 

 Peele Pattean Di Dastan, TV Adaptation of Novel by Dalip Kaur Tiwana
 Bruhon Paar Na Jayin, (Adaptation of The House of Bernarda Alba)
 Sadda Jaggon Seer Mukkeya, Stage Play (Adaptation of Baldev Dhaliwal's story)
 Naun Baran Dus, Stage Play (Adaptation of Varyam Sandhu's story)
 Kashmir Diary, Stage play
 Razayi Stage Play (Adaptation of Veena Varma's story)
 Bandmaster, Stage Play (Translation of Hungarian play Totek)
 Bhabi Maina, Stage Play (Adaptation of Gurbaksh Singh Preetladi's story)
 Kumarswamy, Hindi Stage Play, 1981
 Aakhiri Natak, Stage Play
 Nayak Katha, Hindi Stage Play, 1976

As an actress 
 Almost Pyaar with DJ Mohabbat, Hindi Feature Film
Dil Boley Oberoi, Hindi TV Serial
 Ishqbaaaz, Hindi TV Serial
 Peterson Hill, Hindi TV Serial
 Mukti Bhawan, Hindi Feature Film
 Queen, Hindi Feature Film
 Viji Amma, Documentary
 Sadaa-E-Vaadi, Hindi TV Serial
 Oye Lucky Lucky Oye, Hindi Feature Film
 Gubaare, Tele Film
 The Pride
 The Guru.
 Peele Patteyan Di Dastaan, Punjabi TV Serial
 Viji, Hindi TV Serial
 Khanabadosh, Urdu TV Serial
 Sunehri Jild, Punjabi Telefilm
 Pankhudian, Punjabi TV Serial
 Roop Basant, Punjabi TV Serial
 Mahasangram, Hindi TV Serial
 Ved Vyas Ke Pote, Hindi TV Serial
 Maachis, Feature Film
 Afsane, Hindi TV Serial
 Aatish, Hindi Telefilm
 Rani Kokilan, Punjabi Telefilm
 Wo Ladki, Hindi Telefilm
 Chirion Ka Chamba, Hindi Telefilm
 Tapish, Hindi Telefilm
 Happy Birth Day, Hindi Telefilm
 Ruliya, Punjabi Teleplay
 Blood Wedding, Stage Play
 Thes, Hindi Telefilm, 1985
 Buniyad, Punjabi Serial
 Ruliya, Punjabi Telefilm, 1985
 Suryast, Hindi Stage Play, 1981
 The Chairs, Hindi Stage Play, 1977
 Pagla Ghoda, Stage Play
 Suryast, Hindi Stage Play, 1977
 Surya Ki Antim Kiran Se Surya Ki Pehli Kiran Tak, Hindi Stage Play, 1976
 Daldal, Stage Play

Published works

 Aawan, Punjabi Translation of Chitra Mudgal's Hindi novel
 Miss Julie, Stage Play (Translation of Strindberg's play)
 Mahamarg, Stage Play (Translation of Strindberg's The Great Highway)
 Takdi Dhir, (Translation of Strindberg's The Stronger)
 Abhinay Kala, Book on Art of Acting
 Nataki Sahit, Book on Dramatic Literature
 Bharti Theatre, Book on Indian Literature
 Rangmanch Ate Television Natak , Book on Theatre & Television*

Awards 

Awarded as producer and director at first Indo-Soviet Russian Film Festival in 1989–90 for the video film "Chirion Ka Chamba" produced for Delhi Doordarshan.
Awarded as best writer by Sahitya Kala Parishad, Delhi Administration in 1984 for the script "Kumarswamy".
“Akashwani Award" for best writer by M/o Information & Broadcasting, Govt. of India.
“Rashtriya Ratan Award" for contribution to film and television industry by International Friendship Forum, New Delhi.
Honoured for contribution to cinema by Human Rights Organisation for the film Maachis directed by Gulzar.
Awarded and honoured by Manch – Rangmanch, Amritsar for achievements in the field of theatre and media.

Personal life
Behl is the eldest daughter of dramatist and theatre personality Kapoor Singh Ghuman. Her husband Lalit Behl was a theatre and television director-actor. Her son Kanu Behl is a film writer and director.

References

External links

Books

1949 births
Living people
Actresses from Delhi
Indian stage actresses
Indian television actresses
Indian theatre directors
Indian women television directors
Indian television directors
Indian women television producers
Indian television producers
Academic staff of Punjabi University
Indian women theatre directors
20th-century Indian actresses
Actresses in Hindi television
20th-century Indian film directors
Film directors from Delhi
Indian women screenwriters
Dramatists and playwrights from Delhi
Indian documentary film directors
Indian women television writers
Indian television writers
Women writers from Delhi
20th-century Indian dramatists and playwrights
Indian women documentary filmmakers
Businesswomen from Delhi
Film producers from Delhi
20th-century women writers
Women television producers
Indian Sikhs